

1930–1939

1940–1949

1950–1959

1960–1961

References

See also

List of Latvian films (1962–1989)
List of Latvian films